Osuigwe is an Igbo surname. Notable people with the surname include:

Joseph Osuigwe Chidiebere (born 1985), Nigerian anti-human trafficking advocate, educator, and social entrepreneur
Whitney Osuigwe (born 2002), American tennis player

Surnames of African origin